Catherine Kennedy (or similar) may refer to:

Kathryn Kennedy (1927–2009), California wine grower
Kathryne Kennedy, American author
Catherine Kennedy, character in The Abduction Club
Katherine Kennedy, a contestant in Miss America 2005

See also
Cathy Kennedy (disambiguation)
Kate Kennedy (disambiguation)
Kathleen Kennedy (disambiguation)